Caenides sophia, the scarce costus skipper, is a species of butterfly in the family Hesperiidae. It is found in Ivory Coast, Ghana, Nigeria, Cameroon, the Central African Republic, the Democratic Republic of the Congo and Uganda. The habitat consists of wetter forests.

Adults are attracted to flowers.

The larvae feed on Sorghum arundinaceum.

References

Butterflies described in 1937
Hesperiinae